Zydeco (  or) is a music genre that evolved in southwest Louisiana by French Creole speakers which blends blues, rhythm and blues, and music indigenous to the Louisiana Creoles and the Native American people of Louisiana. Although it is distinct in origin from the Cajun music of Louisiana, the two forms influenced each other, forming a complex of genres native to the region.

Characteristics
Zydeco music is typically played in an uptempo, syncopated manner with a strong rhythmic core, and often incorporates elements of blues, rock and roll, soul music, R&B, Afro-Caribbean, Cajun, and early Creole music. Zydeco music is centered on the accordion, which leads the rest of the band, and a specialized washboard, called a vest frottoir, as a prominent percussive instrument. Other common instruments in zydeco are the electric guitar, bass, keyboard, and drum set. If there are accompanying lyrics, they are typically sung in English or French. Many zydeco performers create original zydeco compositions, though it is also common for musicians to adapt blues standards, R&B hits, and traditional Cajun tunes into the zydeco style.

Origin of term 
The origin of the term "zydeco" is uncertain. One theory is that it derives from the French phrase Les haricots ne sont pas salés, which, when spoken in Louisiana French, is pronounced . This literally translates as "the green beans aren't salted" and is used idiomatically to express hardship.

Initially, several different spellings of the word existed, including "zarico" and "zodico" (in some dialects of French, r has the same pronunciation used by certain dialects of American English for specific instances of d — a voiced alveolar tap ). In 1960, musicologist Mack McCormick wrote liner notes for a compilation album, A Treasury of Field Recordings, and used the spelling "zydeco". The word was used in reviews, and McCormick began publicizing it around Houston as a standard spelling. Its use was also accepted by musician Clifton Chenier, who had previously recorded "Zodico Stomp" in 1955, in his recording "Zydeco Sont Pas Salés". Chenier later claimed credit for having invented the word.

Another possible root word for zydeco is as a West African term for "musicking". Recent studies based on early Louisiana recordings made by Alan and John Lomax suggest that the term, as well as the tradition, may have African origins. The west African languages of tribes affected by the slave trade provide some clues as to the origins of zydeco. In at least a dozen languages from this culture-area of Africa, the phonemes "za", "re", and "go" are frequently associated with dancing and/or playing music". It is also possible that "za re go" evolved into "les haricots" by French-Creole speaking generations unfamiliar with the original language, turning what would have been unfamiliar words into a phonetically similar phrase in the regional language.

The word "zydeco" can refer to the musical genre, the dance style, or a social gathering at which the music is played.

Early history

The original French settlers came to Louisiana in the late 1600s, sent by the Regent of France, Philippe d'Orléans, Duke of Orléans, to help settle the Louisiana Territory. Arriving in New Orleans on seven ships, the settlers quickly moved into the bayous and swamps. There, the French culture permeated those of the Irish, Spanish, Native Indian and German peoples already populating the area.

For 150 years, Louisiana Creoles enjoyed an insular lifestyle, prospering, educating themselves without the government and building their invisible communities under the Code Noir. The French created the Code Noir in 1724 to establish rules for treatment of slaves, as well as restrictions and rights for gens de couleur libres, a growing class of free people of color. They had the right to own land, something few blacks in the American South had at that time.

The disruption of the Louisiana Creole community began when the United States made the Louisiana Purchase and Americans started settling in the state. The new settlers typically recognized only the system of race that prevailed where they came from. When the Civil War ended and the black slaves were freed, Louisiana Creoles often assumed positions of leadership. However, segregationist Democrats in Louisiana classified Creoles with freedmen and by the end of the 19th century had disfranchised most blacks and many poor whites under rules designed to suppress black voting (despite the Fifteenth Amendment to the United States Constitution). Creoles continued to press for education and advancement while negotiating the new society.

Zydeco's rural beginnings and the prevailing economic conditions at its inception are reflected in the song titles, lyrics, and bluesy vocals. The music arose as a synthesis of traditional Creole music, some Cajun music influences, and African American traditions, including R&B, blues, jazz, and gospel. It was also often just called French music or le musique Creole known as "la-la." Amédé Ardoin, the second musician to record the Creole music of southwest Louisiana and its most influential, made his first recordings in 1929. This Creole music served as a foundation for what later became known as zydeco. Originally performed at house dances in the community, the music eventually expanded into the Catholic Church community centers, as Creoles were mostly Catholic, as well as to rural dance halls and nightclubs.

During World War II with the Great Migration, many French-speaking and Louisiana Creole speaking Créoles from the area around Marksville and Opelousas, Louisiana left a poor and prejudiced state for better economic opportunities in Texas. Even more southern blacks migrated to California, where buildup of defense industries provided good jobs without the restrictions of the segregated South. In California blacks from Louisiana could vote and began to participate in political life. Today, there are many Cajun and zydeco festivals throughout the US.

Post-war history

Zydeco music pioneer Clifton Chenier, "The King of Zydeco", made zydeco popular on regional radio stations with his bluesy style and keyboard accordion. In the mid-1950s, Chenier's popularity brought zydeco to the fringes of the American mainstream. He signed with Specialty Records, the same label that first recorded Little Richard and Sam Cooke for wide audiences. Chenier, considered the architect of contemporary zydeco, became the first major zydeco artist with early hits like "Les Haricots Sont Pas Salés" ("The Snap Beans Ain't Salty" — a reference to the singer being too poor to afford salt pork to season the beans).

The first zydeco vest frottoir was designed by Clifton Chenier in 1946 while he and his brother Cleveland were working at an oil refinery in Port Arthur, Texas. The instrument was created at Chenier's request by Willie Landry, a welder-fabricator who worked at the same refinery. Landry's original frottoir is held in the permanent collection of the Smithsonian Institution.

Tejano music performers of the 1950s-1970s such as Little Joe and Freddie Fender were known for their zydeco roots and inspiration, and they helped popularize the style in South Texas within mainstream country music.

In the mid-1980s, Rockin' Sidney brought international attention to zydeco music with his hit tune "My Toot Toot". Clifton Chenier, Rockin' Sidney and Queen Ida all garnered Grammy awards during this pivotal period, opening the door to emerging artists who would continue the traditions. Rockin' Dopsie recorded with Paul Simon and also signed a major label deal during this time.

John Delafose was extremely popular regionally. The music made major advances when emerging bands burst exuberantly onto the national scene, fusing new sounds and styles with the music. Boozoo Chavis, Roy Carrier, Zydeco Force, Nathan and the Zydeco Cha Chas, the Sam Brothers, Terrance Simien, Chubby Carrier, and many others were breathing new life into the music. Zydeco superstar Buckwheat Zydeco was already well into his career, and also signed his deal with Island Records in the mid-1980s. Combined with the national popularity of Creole and Cajun food, and the feature film The Big Easy, set in New Orleans, zydeco music had a revival. New artists were cultivated, the music took a more innovative direction, and zydeco increased in mainstream popularity.

Active zydeco musicians such as C. J. Chenier (son of Clifton Chenier), Chubby Carrier, Geno Delafose, Terrance Simien, Nathan Williams and others began touring internationally during the 1980s. Beau Jocque was a monumental songwriter and innovator who infused zydeco with powerful beats and bass lines in the 1990s, adding striking production and elements of funk, hip-hop and rap. Young performers like Chris Ardoin, Keith Frank, and Zydeco Force added further by tying the sound to the bass drum rhythm to accentuate or syncopate the backbeat even more. This style is sometimes called "double clutching".

Hundreds of zydeco bands continue the music traditions across the U.S. and in Europe, Japan, the UK and Australia. A precocious 7-year-old zydeco accordionist, Guyland Leday, was featured in an HBO documentary about music and young people.

In 2007, zydeco achieved a separate category in the Grammy awards, the Grammy Award for Best Zydeco or Cajun Music Album category. But in 2011 the Grammy awards eliminated the category and folded the genre into its new Best Regional Roots Album category.

More recent zydeco artists include Lil' Nate, Leon Chavis, Mo' Mojo and Kenne' Wayne. Andre Thierry has kept the tradition alive on the West Coast. Dwayne Dopsie (son of Rockin' Dopsie) and his band, the Zydeco Hellraisers, were nominated for best Regional Roots Album in the 2017 Grammy Awards.

While zydeco is a genre that has become synonymous with the cultural and musical identity of Louisiana and an important part of the musical landscape of the United States, this southern black music tradition has received wide recognition throughout the country. Because of the migration of the French-speaking blacks and multiracial Creoles, the mixing of Cajun and Creole musicians, and the warm embrace of people from outside these cultures, there are multiple hotbeds of zydeco: Louisiana, Texas, Oregon, California, and Europe as far north as Scandinavia. There are zydeco festivals throughout America and Europe.

References 

African-American music
American folk music
Louisiana Creole culture
Music of Louisiana